Fox Lake is a lake of Halifax Regional Municipality, Nova Scotia, Canada.

See also
List of lakes in Nova Scotia

References
 National Resources Canada

Lakes of Nova Scotia